Broken Homes is a 1926 American silent drama film directed by Hugh Dierker and starring Gaston Glass, Alice Lake and J. Barney Sherry.

Cast
 Gaston Glass as John Merritt
 Alice Lake as Arline
 J. Barney Sherry as Mr. Merritt - John's Father
 Jane Jennings		
 Ruth Stonehouse

References

Bibliography
 Munden, Kenneth White. The American Film Institute Catalog of Motion Pictures Produced in the United States, Part 1. University of California Press, 1997.

External links
 

1926 films
1926 drama films
1920s English-language films
American silent feature films
Silent American drama films
American black-and-white films
Films directed by Hugh Dierker
1920s American films